The radialis indicis artery (radial artery of index finger) is a branch of the radial artery that provides blood to the index finger.

It arises close to the princeps pollicis artery, and descends between the first dorsal interosseous muscle and the transverse head of the adductor pollicis, and runs along the lateral side of the index finger to its extremity, where it anastomoses with the proper digital artery, supplying the medial side of the finger.

At the lower border of the transverse head of the adductor pollicis, this vessel anastomoses with the princeps pollicis, and gives a communicating branch to the superficial palmar arch.

The princeps pollicis and radialis indicis may arise from a common trunk termed the first palmar metacarpal artery.

References

External links
  - "Anterior view of the arteries of the left hand."
  ("Palm of the hand, deep dissection, anterior view")

Arteries of the upper limb